Melanie "Melli" Müller (born 10 June 1988) is a German reality television personality and schlager singer.

Early life 
From 2005 to 2009, Müller, who was born in Oschatz, trained as a restaurant specialist and a bartender. Discovered by photographer Andreas Koll, she began working as an erotic model in 2010.

Career 
In 2012, Müller had a brief career in pornographic films with the stage name Scarlet Young. In 2013, she was a contestant on the third season of Der Bachelor, the German version of The Bachelor, where she was a finalist. In April 2013, she released the song "Ob Mann, ob Frau – ich nehm's nicht so genau". In June 2013, she took part on the TV show Pool Champions. The same month, she appeared in the Taff series Projekt Paradies: Promi-Heilfasten. In the summer of 2013, she made a mini musical tour in Mallorca.

In January 2014, Müller won the RTL reality show Ich bin ein Star – Holt mich hier raus! In April the same year, she released "Auf geht's, Deutschland schießt ein Tor!" ("Let's go, Germany score!"), a song for the 2014 FIFA World Cup.

Since 2013, she has mainly been active as a schlager singer.

Outside of her entertainment career, Müller is an entrepreneur; she owns two online store websites, Lustshoppen24 and Königsklasse, and opened a fashion boutique in the center of Leipzig in 2013, which closed after a few months.

References

External links 

 
 
 Appearance at Nude Art Models (2012, Online-Magazine)

1988 births
Living people
People from Oschatz
People from Bezirk Leipzig
German expatriates in Spain
German pornographic film actresses
German female models
German television personalities
Ich bin ein Star – Holt mich hier raus! winners
21st-century German women singers